Loïc Vandeweghe (born 23 September 1983) is a Belgian field hockey player. He competed in the men's tournament at the 2008 Summer Olympics.

References

External links
 

1983 births
Living people
Belgian male field hockey players
Olympic field hockey players of Belgium
Field hockey players at the 2008 Summer Olympics
Sportspeople from Ghent
2002 Men's Hockey World Cup players